Stith is a surname of unknown origin, and may refer to:

Persons
Shyrone O. Stith (b. 1978). American Professional Football player  
Bryant Stith (b. 1970), American professional basketball player
Charles Richard Stith (born 1949), American author and editor; former U.S. Ambassador to Tanzania
DM Stith (b. 1980), American singer-songwriter
James H. Stith (b. 1941)), American physicist
John Stith (fl. 1656–1691), Virginia colonist, member of the Virginia House of Burgesses
John E. Stith (b. 1947), American science fiction author
Laura Denvir Stith (b. 1953), American jurist, judge on the Supreme Court of Missouri
Michelle Stith (contemporary), President of the Los Angeles, California branch of the Church of Scientology
Thomas Stith, III (contemporary), town councilman of Durham, North Carolina
William Stith (1707–1755), an early American historian and the third president of the College of William & Mary

Stith is also a first name, particularly in
Stith Thompson (1885-1976), folklorist